Syed Masood-ul-Hasan Tabish Dehlvi, TI, (born November 9, 1913 - September 23, 2004) was an Urdu poet.

Biography
Born on November 9, 1911 in Delhi as Syed Masood-ul-Hasan Tabish Dehlvi to Munshi Zakaullah and a mother "who had memorised thousands of Urdu and Persian couplets", Tabish joined All India Radio in 1939. After Partition of India, he migrated to Pakistan and worked for Radio Pakistan.

Awards

Tabish received many awards in his lifetime and was finally decorated with the coveted award of Tamgha-i-Imtiaz by the government of Pakistan in 1998.

Books
His notable collection of poetry includes:
 Nimroz(1963)
 Chiragh-e-Sehra(1982)
 Ghubar-e-Anjum(1984)
 Mah-e-Shikasta(1993)
 Kisht-e-Nawa (full collection)
 Nazr-e-Tabish

References

Pakistani poets
Urdu-language poets from Pakistan
Muhajir people
Recipients of Tamgha-e-Imtiaz
Pakistani Sunni Muslims
People from British India
1911 births
2004 deaths
20th-century poets
Poets from Karachi